Fatima al-Ashabi or Fatima al-'Ushbi (born 1959) is a Yemeni poet.

Works
 Wahaj al-fajr [The Glow of Dawn], 1991
 Innaha Fatima [She is Fatima], Baghdad, 2000.

References

External links
 Le ciel meurt-il? by Fatima al-Ashabi

1959 births
Living people
Yemeni poets
Yemeni women poets